British Columbia is a province of Canada, which has given its name to many associated places and institutions:

Geographic locations
 British Columbia Coast
 British Columbia Interior
 British Columbia Southern Interior

Companies
 Bank of British Columbia
 British Columbia Lottery Corporation
 Insurance Corporation of British Columbia

Educational and scientific institutions
 British Columbia Institute of Technology
 British Columbia Wildlife Park, a zoo
 Royal British Columbia Museum in Vancouver, British Columbia
 University of British Columbia
 University of British Columbia Library
 University of Northern British Columbia

Rail
 British Columbia Electric Railway
 Southern Railway of British Columbia
 45559 British Columbia, a British LMS Jubilee Class locomotive

Politics
 British Columbia Action Party
 British Columbia Conservative Party
 British Columbia Democratic Alliance
 British Columbia Democratic Coalition
 British Columbia Liberal Party
 British Columbia Moderate Democratic Movement
 British Columbia Party
 British Columbia Treaty Process
 British Columbia Unity Party
 British Columbia Utilities Commission
 Communist Party of British Columbia
 Executive Council of British Columbia
 Green Party of British Columbia
 Order of British Columbia, the Canadian province's highest honour
 Reform Party of British Columbia

Sports
 British Columbia Derby
 British Columbia Hockey League
 British Columbia Intercollegiate Hockey League
 British Columbia Lacrosse Association
 British Columbia Lions, a Canadian Football League team
 British Columbia Mountaineering Club
 British Columbia Rugby Union

Other
 The British Columbia Dragoons
 British Columbia Magazine
 British Columbia Pipers Association
 Spirit of British Columbia, an S class ferry in the BC Ferries fleet